The North American Forum is an annual meeting of U.S., Canadian and Mexican government and business representatives to discuss issues related to continental economic and social integration. The Forum is chaired jointly by former United States Secretary of State George Shultz, former Mexican Finance Minister Pedro Aspe, and former Alberta premier Peter Lougheed.

History
The inaugural North American Forum took place in October 2005 in Sonoma, California. The Forum is tri-national in scope and design, but the agenda each year is designed by the organizing country. An October 27, 2005 article in the Financial Post contained a partial list of invited guests, which included former Canadian finance minister John Manley, Mexican ambassador to the U.S. Carlos de Icaza, Chevron CEO David J. O'Reilly, former head of the CIA R. James Woolsey, Jr., and a host of U.S. policy advisors to President George W. Bush.

The 2006 North American Forum took place from September 12 to September 14 at the Banff Springs Hotel in Alberta, Canada. It was hosted by the Canadian Council of Chief Executives with help from the Canada West Foundation. Under the title Continental Prosperity in the New Security Environment, the Forum included sessions on "North American Energy Strategy," "Demographic and Social Dimensions of North American Integration," and "Border Infrastructure," among other topics.

Similar discussions regularly take place among North American government and business representatives through the Security and Prosperity Partnership of North America. And in a speech to the Greater Toronto Marketing Alliance on October 10, 2006, U.S. Consul General John Nay referred to the North American Forum as a "sister organization" and "parallel structure" to the SPP.

The third meeting of the North American Forum was held October 12–14, 2007 in Nuevo Vallarta, Mexico. The title was "North American Cooperation and Community" and the studied topics were demographic trends, migration and development, and regional approaches to addressing climate change.

2008 saw the return of the Forum to the United States, when the meeting was held June 15–17 in Washington, DC. The theme was "Toward a More Resilient North America" and the Forum took stock of progress made among the three governments and in the private sector. Secretary of Energy Samuel Bodman, Secretary of Defense Robert Gates, and Deputy Secretary of State John Negroponte all addressed the Forum. Secretary Gates' speech can be read on the Defense Department's website.

The most recent meeting of the North American Forum was in October 2009. In Canada for a second time, the Forum met in Ottawa to discuss "Beyond the Crisis: Forging a More Resilient North America." The Washington Post Associate Editor Jim Hoagland attended the meeting and wrote about the meeting in an article that ran on October 25, 2009. Mary O'Grady of The Wall Street Journal interviewed Forum Co-Chair and former US Secretary of State George P. Shultz about the drug war in Mexico, one of the many topics discussed at the meeting. Her interview ran in the Journal on October 11, 2009.

Participants
The Council of Canadians acquired a copy of the 2006 agenda and guest list, which is posted below:

Canadian participants
 Col. Peter Atkinson, Special Advisor to Chief of Defence Staff;
 Hon. Perrin Beatty, Canadian Manufacturers & Exporters;
 Mr. Peter M. Boehm, Assistant Deputy Minister (North America) Foreign Affairs and International Trade Canada;
 Mr. Thomas d’Aquino, Canadian Council of Chief Executives;
 Hon. Stockwell Day, Minister of Public Safety, Government of Canada;
 Dr. Wendy Dobson, The Institute for International Business;
 Mr. N. Murray Edwards, Edco Financial Holdings Ltd.;
 Mr. Ward P.D. Elcock, Deputy Minister of National Defence;
 Mr. Bill Elliott, Associate Deputy Minister, Public Safety;
 Dr. John English, The Cdn Centre for International Governance Innovation;
 Mr. Brian Felesky, Felesky Flynn LLP;
 Mr. Richard L. George, Suncor Energy Inc.;
 Dr. Roger Gibbins, Canada West Foundation;
 Rear Adm Roger Girouard, Commander Joint Task Force Pacific, Cdn Forces;
 Major Gen Daniel Gosselin, Director General, International Security Policy;
 Mr. James K. Gray, Canada West Foundation;
 Mr. Fred Green, Canadian Pacific Railway;
 Mr. V. Peter Harder, Deputy Minister of Foreign Affairs;
 Mr. Paul J. Hill, Harvard Developments Inc.;
 General Rick Hillier, Chief of the Defence Staff;
 Mr. Pierre Marc Johnston, Heenan Blaikie;
 Mr. James Kinnear, Pengrowth Corporation;
 Mr. Harold N. Kvisle, TransCanada Corporation;
 Hon. John P. Manley, Business Council of Canada (formerly Canadian Council of Chief Executives), McCarthy Tetrault LLP, ;
 Mr. Ron Mannix, Coril Holdings Ltd.;
 Mr. Ron Mathison, Matco Investments;
 Hon. Anne McLellan, Senior Counsel, Bennett Jones;
 Hon. Greg Melchin, Minister of Energy, Government of Alberta;
 Ms. Sharon Murphy, Chevron Corporation Canada;
 Ms. Sheila O’Brien, President, Corporate Director, Belvedere Investments;
 Hon. Gordon O’Connor, Minister of Defense, Government of Canada;
 Mr. Berel Rodal, International Center on Nonviolent Conflict;
 Mr. Gordon Smith, Chairman, The International Development Research Centre.

American participants
 Ms. Deborah Bolton, Political Advisor to Commander, US Northcom;
 Mr. Ron T. Covais, President, The Americas, Lockheed Martin Corporation;
 Sec. Kenneth W. Dam, Max Pam Professor Emeritus of American & Foreign Law and Senior Lecturer, University of Chicago Law School;
 Mr. Dan Fisk, Senior Director, Western Hemisphere, National Security Council;
 Sec. Ryan Henry, Deputy Under Secretary of Defense for Policy;
 Ms. Carla A. Hills, Chairman & CEO, Hills & Co.;
 Ms. Caryn Hollis, DASD (Acting) Western Hemisphere Affairs;
 Mr. Bill Irwin, Manager - International Government Affairs; Policy, Government and Public Affairs, Chevron Corporation;
 Mr. Robert G. James, President, Enterprise Asset Management Inc.;
 Admiral Tim Keating, Commander, United States Northern Command;
 Mr. Floyd Kvamme, Chair, President’s Council of Advisors on Science & Technology and Director, Centre for Global Security Res.;
 Dr. Ronald F. Lehman II, Director, Center for Global Security Research, Lawrence Livermore National Laboratory;
 Mr. William W. McIlhenny, Policy Planning Council for Western Hemisphere Affairs;
 Dr. Peter McPherson, President, National Association of State Universities & Land-Grant Colleges;
 Ms. Doris Meissner, Senior Fellow, Migration Policy Institute;
 Dr. George Miller, Director, Lawrence Livermore National Laboratory;
 Mr. George Nethercutt, Chairman, US Section of the Permanent Joint Board of Defense, US – Canada (Security);
 Mary O’Grady, Journalist for The Wall Street Journal (Area Specialist);
 Dr. Robert A. Pastor, Director, Center for North American Studies, American University, Washington, DC;
 Dr. William Perry, Co-Director, Preventive Defense Project;
 Lt. Gen. Gene Renuart, USAF Senior Military Assist. to Sec. Rumsfeld;
 Mr. Eric Ruff, Department of Defense Press Secretary;
 Sec. Donald Rumsfeld, Secretary of Defense, US Department of Defense;
 Dr. James Schlesinger, Former Sec. Of Energy & Defense;
 Mr. William Schneider, President, International Planning Services;
 Sec. Clay Sell, Deputy Secretary of Energy, US Dept. of Energy;
 Dr. Thomas A.  Shannon, Assistant Secretary of State for Western Hemisphere A;
 Dr. David G. Victor, Director, Program on Energy & Sustainable Development, Center for Environmental Science & Policy;
 Maj. Gen. Mark A Volcheff, Director, Plans, Policy & Strategy, NORAD-NORTHCOM;
 Ms. Jane Wales,	President & CEO, World Affairs Council of Northern California;
 Mr. R. James Woolsey, Vice President, Booz Allen Hamilton.

Mexican participants
 Emb Andrés Rozental, (Mexican Coordinator)– Mexican Council on Foreign Relations;
 Silvia Hernández Enríquez, Former Senator and Chair of the Senate Foreign Relations Subcommittee on North America;
 Mario Molina, 1995 Nobel Laureate in Chemistry;
 Fernando Chico Pardo, CEO, Promecap;
 Juan Gallardo, CEO, Grupo GEUSA;
 Gerónimo Gutiérrez, Deputy Foreign Minister for North America;
 Luis de la Calle, Consultant. Former Deputy Minister of Economy;
 Agustín Barrios Gómez, Solutions Abroad;
 Vinicio Suro, Pemex;
 Eduardo Medina Mora, Secretary of Public Security;
 Carlos Heredia, State Government of Michoacán;
 Jaime Zabludowsky, Consultant and former trade negotiator;
 Manuel Arango, CEO, Grupo Concord;
 Jorge Santibañez, President, El Colegio de la Frontera Norte;
 Luis Rubio, CIDAC;
 Mónica Serrano, El Colegio de México, Señor Fellow Oxford University;
 Arturo Sarukhan, Coordinator of Int’l Affairs, Campaign of Felipe Calderón;
 Juan Camilo Mouriño, General Coordinator of President Elect’s transition team;
 Ernesto Cordero, Coordinator for Public Policy Issues.

Ambassadors/Consuls-General
 Mr. Carlos de Icaza, Ambassador of Mexico to the United States;
 Mr. Gaëtan Lavertu, Ambassador of Canada to Mexico;
 Ms. Maria Teresa Garcia Segovia de Madero, Ambassador of Mexico to Canada;
 Mr. Thomas Huffaker, U.S. Consul General in Calgary (on DOD’s list);
 Mr. John Dickson, Deputy Chief of Mission, US Embassy in Ottawa (representing Ambassador of US to Canada);
 Mr. Colin Robertson, Minister & Head, Washington Advocacy Secretariat (representing Ambassador of Canada to US).

See also
 North American Free Trade Agreement
 Security and Prosperity Partnership of North America

References

International organizations based in the Americas
Economy of North America
Trilateral relations of Canada, Mexico, and the United States